Guy Michelmore is an English film and television composer and former television news presenter.

Early life
Michelmore is the son of BBC presenters Cliff Michelmore and Jean Metcalfe. His mother Jean was the presenter of Family Favourites and Woman's Hour. His father Cliff was best known for the BBC television programme Tonight.  Cliff once interviewed himself, and asked whether either his son or daughter had shown any interest in television – Cliff answered by saying that ten-year-old Guy was "at that point where he is fascinated and interested in all things... even his father's job!" 

Michelmore was educated at the independent St John's School in Leatherhead, Surrey and Pembroke College, Oxford.

News presenter
Michelmore began reporting on Anglia TV's About Anglia before joining the BBC programme Newsroom South East in 1993. He left the programme to be replaced by Tim Ewart from ITN. 

Michelmore famously spilt his drink all over himself and his desk before going into a live link on Newsroom South East. The incident was shown on the BBC's Auntie's Bloomers outtakes show.

Composer
Michelmore is a composer of music for film and television. He is best known for his work with Eyewitness composing the main theme; and for Marvel which includes eight animated feature films and a number of TV series, including Avengers: Earth's Mightiest Heroes, Iron Man: Armoured Adventures and The Super Hero Squad Show. He scored the puppet feature film Jackboots on Whitehall in 2010. His other work includes The Jungle Book, Growing Up Creepie, for which he received an Annie Award nomination, and scores for Emmy Award winner Tutenstein, The Woodlies, The DaVincibles, amongst others. He worked extensively scoring natural history films and was nominated for an Emmy Award for his score to "The Queen of Trees" for the Nature series on PBS.

Selected filmography

Film
Thor: Tales of Asgard – 2011 direct-to-video animated film
The Commuter – 2010 short film
Jackboots on Whitehall – 2010 puppet film
Planet Hulk – 2010 direct-to-video animated film
Beyond the Pole – 2009 film
Hulk Vs – 2009 direct-to-video animated release
Next Avengers: Heroes of Tomorrow – 2008 direct-to-video animated film
Doctor Strange: The Sorcerer Supreme – 2007 direct-to-video animated film
The Invincible Iron Man – 2007 direct-to-video animated film
Ultimate Avengers – 2006 direct-to-video animated film
Ultimate Avengers 2 – 2006 direct-to-video animated film
Voices Inside – 2005 short film
Frozen – 2005 film
Mavis and the Mermaid – 2004 short film
Flyfishing – 2002 film
Hellion – 2001 short film
Distant Shadow – 2000 film
The Killing Zone – 1999 film
Dead Clean – 1998 short film
Phoenix – 1997 short film

Television
The Woodlies – 2012 animated TV series
The DaVincibles – 2011 animated TV series
The Avengers: Earth's Mightiest Heroes – 2010 animated TV series
The Jungle Book – 2010 animated TV series
Iron Man: Armored Adventures – 2009 animated TV series
The Super Hero Squad Show – 2009 animated TV series
Me, Robot – 2009 Cosmic Quantum Ray animated TV episode
A Martian Christmas – 2008 animated TV film
Growing Up Creepie – 2006 animated TV series
The Queen of Trees – 2005 Natural World (2006 Nature) TV episode
Roman Vice – 2005 TV film
Time Machine – 2004 TV series
Di's Guys – 2004 TV mini-series
Tutenstein – 2003 animated TV series
Cousins – 2000 TV series
Tale of the Tides: The Hyaena and the Mudskipper – 1998 TV film
Africa's Paradise of Thorns – 1997 TV film
Robin Hood: Outlaw of the Forest – 1995 Biography TV episode
Eyewitness – 1994 TV series

Training courses
Michelmore is CEO and founding member of the online education provider ThinkSpace Education, which trains composers for jobs in music for visual media. ThinkSpace Education was the world's first online postgraduate degree provider in composition for film, games and television.

ThinkSpace Education's YouTube channel is hosted by Michelmore, where he performs scoring demonstrations and teaches compositional techniques.

References

External links

Deepwater Blue Guy Michelmore's personal website

Living people
Year of birth missing (living people)
British reporters and correspondents
English television composers
English male composers
English television presenters
People educated at St John's School, Leatherhead
Place of birth missing (living people)